Stettler Airport  is a registered aerodrome located  southwest of Stettler, Alberta, Canada.

References

External links
Place to Fly on COPA's Places to Fly airport directory

Registered aerodromes in Alberta
County of Stettler No. 6